Mario Daniel Vega (born 3 June 1984) is an Argentine former professional footballer who played as a goalkeeper. He is the current assistant manager of Greek Super League club AEK Athens.

Career
Arriving from Nueva Chicago for the 2007–08 season he is at the start of the season considered to be River's fourth-choice keeper after the unexpected return of Juan Pablo Carrizo.

Vega was part of the River Plate squad that won the Clausura 2008 tournament, but he did not play in any of the games.

Anorthosis Famagusta
On 2 September 2013, Anorthosis Famagusta announced the contract agreement with Mario Vega.

In November 2013, Vega assumed the role of starting goalkeeper following an injury to Anorthosis Famagusta's starting keeper Mathieu Valverde.

Miami FC
In September 2016, Vega signed with Miami FC of the North American Soccer League. Vega played in 64 regular season games for Miami from 2016 to 2017. After the dissolution of the NASL, Vega stayed with the team as they played as Miami FC 2 in the National Premier Soccer League, winning the 2018 NPSL championship in August.

Tampa Bay Rowdies
Following the conclusion of the National Premier Soccer League season, Vega signed with the Tampa Bay Rowdies for the remainder of their United Soccer League season.

San Jose Earthquakes
On 18 January 2019, Vega signed with Major League Soccer's San Jose Earthquakes. Following the 2021 season, Vega's contract with San Jose expired.

References

External links 
 Argentine Primera statistics
 Player profile at River´s website

1984 births
Living people
People from Neuquén Province
Association football goalkeepers
Argentine people of Quechua descent
Argentine footballers
Argentine expatriate footballers
Club Atlético River Plate footballers
Nueva Chicago footballers
Anorthosis Famagusta F.C. players
Miami FC players
Tampa Bay Rowdies players
San Jose Earthquakes players
Argentine Primera División players
Cypriot First Division players
North American Soccer League players
National Premier Soccer League players
Major League Soccer players
San Jose Earthquakes non-playing staff